Bayang Barrios (born on June 12, 1968 to parents of Lumad origin) is a Filipina musician and singer who hails from Bunawan, Agusan del Sur, and is known for her use of indigenous instruments and styles.

In 2005, Barrios' song "Isipin Mo Na Lang" was used in the end credits of the indie Filipino film Ang Pagdadalaga ni Maximo Oliveros (The Blossoming of Maximo Oliveros). In September 2013, she launched her fifth studio album entitled Malaya.

Discography

Albums
Bayang Makulay (1997)
Singles (Bayang Barrios)
Harinawa (2002)
Alon (2004) 
Biyaya (2008)
Malaya (2013)

Singles
"Hade!! (Etheria Theme Song)"
"Alay Sa Aking Mga Kapatid"
"Ayoko Na" 
"Bagong Umaga"
"Habang Narito Pa" 
"Ka-Tribo Ko" 
"Kay Tsong"
"Lalalala-laryang (Himig ni Inay)" 
"Malayo Man, Malapit Din" – (Theme from Pinoy Abroad) 
"Mekaniko Ng Makina Ko" 
"Mulat" – (Theme from Limang Dekada)
"Nasaan Na Tayo Ngayon" 
"Saan Nanggagaling Ang Himig?" 
"Sanggol Sa Sinapupunan"
"Matanglawin"
"Alon"
"Gising Na Kaibigan"

Awards

References

External links
Bayang Barrios
Bayang Barrios in Tugtog Pinoy
Bayang Barrios beyond anthems

1968 births
Living people
People from Agusan del Sur
Mindanao artists
Filipino singer-songwriters
Filipino women pop singers
Filipino folk singers
Indigenous musicians
Encantadia
20th-century Filipino women singers
21st-century Filipino women singers